Catholicos of the East and Malankara Metropolitan are the titles used by the Malankara Orthodox Syrian Church, which is also called the Indian Orthodox Church, for the same bishop holding two offices of  Catholicos of the East and Malankara Metropolitan. The term "Catholicos" is derived from the Greek word Katholikos (Καθολικός), meaning "Universal Bishop". His Holiness Baselius Marthoma Mathews III (Indian Orthodox Church) is the present Catholicos of the East and Malankara Metropolitan.

History

Founding

Christianity has had a presence in India since its inception in the early centuries. Church tradition holds that St. Thomas the Apostle initially brought Christianity to India in AD 52 and was martyred in Mylapore, now in the modern state of Tamil Nadu. Pantaenus, the leader of the Alexander Theological school, visited India and found an active Christian Community there in 190 A.D.

In 544, Theodosius, the Patriarch of Alexandria, ordained Bishop Mar Jacob Baradaeus for the expansion of a Syriac Church weakened by Byzantine persecution subsequent to the Council of Chalcedon. In 559, Mar Jacob visited the east and consecrated a Catholicos for Orthodox Christians who accepted the Council of Ephesus and rejected the Council of Chalcedon. Mar Jacob himself was ordained a general bishop by Patriarch Theodosius of Alexandria.

Council of Capharthutha

The conflicts between the Patriarch of Antioch and Maphriyan resulted in the Council of Capharthutha in February 869. This assembly codified eight canons dealing with the Patriarch and the Maphrian of Tigris that the bishops and the monks in the Mar Mathai's Monastery, should submit to and obey the Maphrian whose seat is in Tigris, that the Patriarch should not interfere in the administration of the Church in Tigris, unless when invited. In the same way the maphrian should not interfere in the Patriarchal See.

Also, when the Maphrian is present along with the Patriarch of Antioch, he should be seated immediately at the right hand side of the Patriarch. The name of the Maphrian shall be mentioned immediately after that of the Patriarch, in the liturgy; and he should receive the Holy Qurbono after the Patriarch. When a Maphrian is alive, a Patriarch should not be installed without his concurrence, otherwise, the orientals shall have the right to install the Maphrian by themselves. The question of who should perform the laying on of hands on the new Patriarch - i.e., the Maphrian or the President of the Synod, shall be decided by four bishops, two each elected by the orientals and the westerners (Antiochan) respectively.

Other articles include agreement that the mutual excommunications between the orientals and the Antiochans shall be withdrawn, and that a bishop excommunicated by the Maphrian shall also be considered as excommunicated by the Patriarch.

Middle Ages
In 1238 the West Syrians installed Mar Philexnos as Patriarch without the concurrence or participation of Mar Gregorios Bar Ebraya (Bar Hebraeus; one of the Maphriyans).

Modern history
The Church believes that this Catholicate, which is in the succession of Oriental Orthodox Maphrianate of the East, was established to India in 1912 due to the efforts of Ignatius Abdul Masih II, the Patriarch of Antioch and Vattaserill Mar Dionysius, the Malankara Metropolitan. Since the Indian church was under the Ancient Catholicate of Persia, and can be seen as the only remaining part of the Persian church, it is logical for the Catholicate to reside in India.

There have been eight Catholicoi in direct succession since establishing the Catholicate of the East in India. The Catholicos has jurisdiction over the dioceses and churches in most parts of India as well as in the USA, Canada, United Kingdom, Europe, South Africa, Persian Gulf nations, Malaysia, Singapore, Australia and New Zealand.

 the Catholicos of the Malankara Church was Catholicos Baselios Marthoma Mathews III.

Organization
 The Church is in the Oriental Orthodox family following the Orthodox faith of the three Ecumenical Councils of Nicaea, Constantinople and Ephesus.
 The Malankara Orthodox Syrian Church is a division of the Orthodox Syrian Church and the chief Primate of the Orthodox Syrian Church is the Patriarch of Antioch.
 The Orthodox Syrian Church of the East is an autocephalous branch of the Orthodox Syrian Church and the chief Primate of the Orthodox Syrian Church of the East is the Catholicos of the East aka Maphrian.
 The Malankara Orthodox Syrian Church is an autonomous metropolitan Archdiocese of the Orthodox Syrian Church of the East. The Primate of the Malankara Orthodox Syrian Church is called the Malankara Metropolitan.
 The two titles, Catholicos of the East and Malankara Metropolitan, are with separate responsibilities, but have been always held by the same individual in accordance with the constitution of the Church adopted in 1934.
 As Catholicos of the East, he consecrates bishops for the Indian Orthodox Church, presides over the synod, declares and implements its decisions, conducts the administration on behalf of the synod, and consecrates the Holy Mooron (oil).
 As Malankara Metropolitan., he is the head of the Malankara Church, the President of the Malankara Syrian Christian Association and the Managing Committee. The prime jurisdiction regarding the temporal, ecclesiastical, and spiritual administration of the Indian Orthodox Church is vested in the Malankara Metropolitan subject to the provisions of the Church constitution adopted in 1934.

Lineage of Catholicos

Baselios Paulos I (1912-1913)
Baselios Geevarghese I (1925-1928) 
Baselios Geevarghese II (1929–1964) also Malankara Metropolitan from 1934
Baselios Augen I (1964-1975)
Baselios Marthoma Mathews I  (1975–1991)
Baselios Marthoma Mathews II (1991–2005) 
Baselios Marthoma Didymus I (2005–2010) 
Baselios Marthoma Paulose II (2010–2021)
Baselios Marthoma Mathews III (2021-)

See also
 Malankara Metropolitan
 List of Malankara Metropolitans
 Malankara Orthodox Syrian Church

Footnotes

External links 
 Official Website of The Catholicos of The East and Malankara Metropolitan 
 Catholicos of The East and Malankara Metropolitan
 

Eastern Christianity in India